The 405th Army Field Support Brigade (405th AFSB) is stationed at Kaiserslautern, Germany. 405th AFSB  is under operational control (OPCON) of the 21st Theater Sustainment Command (21st TSC), a command of U.S. Army Europe and Africa (USAREUR-AF), the US Army component of EUCOM, a combatant command. 

405th AFSB sources from Army Pre-positioned Stock-2 (APS-2) to provision units. 

405th AFSB is currently supporting Defender Europe 21, a 28,000-troop exercise of EUCOM and NATO, from 26 countries, ranging from the Baltics to Morocco. Defender Europe 2021 will run from March til June 2021, involving dozens of operations.

References

Support 405